The Uttarakhand Chardham Devasthanam Management Act, 2019 was enacted by the Government of Uttarakhand in December 2019. It aims at bringing the Chota Char Dham of Badrinath, Kedarnath, Gangotri, Yamunotri and 49 other temples under the purview of a proposed shrine board.

Description 
As per the act, the shrine board is the highest governing body for the management of the temples with power to frame policies, make decisions to give effect to the provisions of this act, of budget formulation and to sanction expenditure among others. The board may also give instructions for the safe custody, prevention and management of funds, valuable securities, jewellery and properties vested in the temples. The board was also supposed to provide integrated, advanced and smooth services to the devotees. Earlier before the Chota Char Dham was governed by Shri Badrinath-Kedarnath Mandir Samiti which was chaired by a state government appointed person.

Criticism 
The Act was widely criticized by the local Hindu priests and Vishwa Hindu Parishad Leaders who were against the formation of any board and want that the Hindu temples must be governed by the Hindu society, not the government. Hindu saints  and VHP leaders also protested several times against the act. In July 2020, a Public Interest Litigation was filed by Rajya Sabha MP Subramanian Swamy challenging the constitution validity of the Uttarakhand Chardham Devasthanam Management Act, 2019 and asking to sought a direction striking down the act which was dismissed by the Uttarakhand High Court.

Repeal of Uttarakhand Devasthanam Management Act, 2019 
In July 2021 Pushkar Singh Dhami led BJP government announced the formation of High power committee to review the Uttarakhand Chardham Devasthanam Management Act, 2019 accepting the requests of priests and VHP leaders. On November 30, 2021 the Uttarakhand government announced the repeal of the act following the report of the High power committee. Politically the withdrawal of act was also seen as a "political stunt" by the BJP government ahead of the 2022 assembly elections.

References 

2019 in Indian law
Law about religion in India
Uttarakhand